Josef Bím (24 January 1901 – 5 September 1934) was a Czechoslovak soldier and skier.

Bím was born in Vysoké nad Jizerou. He was a member of the national Olympic military patrol team in 1924 which placed fourth. Furthermore he finished 13th at the Nordic combined event and 26th at the ski jumping competition.

He also took part at the FIS Nordic World Ski Championships 1925 and 1926, where he finished 5th at the Nordic combined event in 1925 and 23rd in 1926. At ski jumping he failed in 1926.

In 1928 he placed 20th at the ski jumping event of the Winter Olympics.

External links 
 
 Josef Bím, sports-reference.com

Czechoslovak military patrol (sport) runners
Czechoslovak male Nordic combined skiers
Czechoslovak male ski jumpers
Military patrol competitors at the 1924 Winter Olympics
Nordic combined skiers at the 1924 Winter Olympics
Ski jumpers at the 1924 Winter Olympics
Ski jumpers at the 1928 Winter Olympics
Olympic Nordic combined skiers of Czechoslovakia
Olympic ski jumpers of Czechoslovakia
Olympic biathletes of Czechoslovakia
People from Vysoké nad Jizerou
1901 births
1934 deaths
Sportspeople from the Liberec Region